Sirkeli may refer to the following places in Turkey:

Sirkeli, Ceyhan, village in village in the district of Ceyhan, Adana Province
Sirkeli Höyük, tell located in the above village
Sirkeli, Çubuk, village in the district of Çubuk, Ankara Province